USS Winston S. Churchill (DDG-81) is an  destroyer of the United States Navy. She is named after Sir Winston Churchill, former Prime Minister of the United Kingdom. This ship is the 31st destroyer of her class. Winston S. Churchill was the 18th ship of this class to be built at Bath Iron Works in Bath, Maine, and construction began on 7 May 1998. She was launched and christened on 17 April 1999. On 10 March 2001, she was commissioned during a ceremony at Town Point Park in Norfolk, Virginia.

Naming 

On 29 November 1995, on a visit to the United Kingdom, President Bill Clinton announced to their Parliament that the new ship would be named after Sir Winston Churchill, a former Prime Minister of the United Kingdom. She was the first destroyer and only the fourth U.S. Navy warship named after a British citizen, and the first since 1976 named after a non-U.S. citizen (that being ), though Churchill was an honorary U.S. citizen and his mother was American.

The former frigate  was also named after a person from a country in the Commonwealth of Nations, Harold Holt, the Australian Prime Minister, who disappeared, (presumed drowned), while still in office just a year before Harold E. Holt was laid down. Winston S. Churchill is the first ship to be named after a British citizen or British Prime Minister of the modern era.

Winston S. Churchill is the only U.S. Navy vessel to have a Royal Navy exchange officer permanently assigned to the ship's company (usually a Navigation Officer). The U.S. Navy had a permanent U.S. Navy Officer on the Royal Navy ship, until her decommissioning on 8 July 2005. Winston S. Churchill is also the only U.S. Naval vessel to fly a foreign ensign. Being named after a Briton, the Royal Navy's White Ensign is honorarily flown on special occasions from the ship's mast, on the port side, whereas the U.S. flag is flown from the starboard side. However, during normal operations, only the U.S. flag is flown on the center of the main mast.

Design
The ship is the first of the Flight IIA variants fitted with the 62-caliber Mark 45 Mod 4 naval gun system. The guns' longer barrels allow more complete combustion of the propellant, reducing barrel flare and improving projectile velocity and firepower against ship and shore targets; additionally, the Mk 45 mod 4 uses a modified gun-house, designed to reduce its radar signature. Winston S. Churchill is armed with Tomahawk, Standard and ASROC (VLA) missiles.

The vessel additionally contains two hangars, not present in earlier destroyers; these can house Light Airborne Multi-Purpose System (LAMPS) Sikorsky SH-60B or MH-60R Seahawk helicopters. These LAMPS can be fitted with air-to-surface missiles for surface ship attacks, and torpedoes for submarine attacks.

The ship is also fitted with the AN/SPY-1D phased array radar—this represents a significant advancement in the detection capabilities of the Aegis weapon system and provides enhanced resistance to electronic countermeasures.

Service history 
The contract to build Winston S. Churchill was awarded to the Bath Iron Works Corporation on 6 January 1995, and the keel was laid down on 7 May 1998. Winston S. Churchill was launched on 17 April 1999, delivered 13 October 2000, and commissioned 10 March 2001. The launch and christening of the ship was co-sponsored by Lady Soames, the daughter of Winston Churchill, and Mrs. Janet Cohen, wife of the Secretary of Defense. Her first commanding officer was Commander (and future Vice Admiral) Michael T. Franken.

On 14 May 2001, Winston S. Churchill underwent shock trials off the coast of Florida. These trials subjected the ship to several close-range underwater detonations, each consisting of 7 tons of high explosives, and were performed to collect data concerning ship survivability and damage resistance in a modern threat environment. Winston S. Churchill sustained minor damage during these three tests. 

On 14 September 2001, (three days after the 11 September 2001 attacks), the German Navy destroyer  passed close abeam Winston S. Churchill and rendered honors by manning the rails, flying the Stars and Stripes at half-mast, and the display of a banner reading "We Stand By You".  An e-mail sent by an ensign on board Winston S. Churchill described the occasion.

In January 2003, Winston S. Churchill deployed with the  battle group in support of the Iraq War's Operation Iraqi Freedom, firing several Tomahawk missiles. Winston S. Churchill returned to Norfolk at the end of May 2003.
 
Both ships suffered minor damage, and no injuries were reported. Both ships returned to their homeport at Naval Station Norfolk under their own power.
 
On 22 January 2006 Winston S. Churchill captured a suspected pirate vessel in the Indian Ocean as part of an ongoing effort to help maintain law and order in the region.

On 26 September 2010, Winston S. Churchill came across a disabled skiff in the Gulf of Aden. After attempts to repair the skiff's engines failed Winston S. Churchill took the vessel under tow towards Somalia. On 27 September the skiff sank when the 85 passengers rushed to one side of the skiff during a food delivery causing the vessel to capsize. Winston S. Churchill was able to rescue 61 of the passengers and continued towards Somalia on 28 September.

Her homeport was formerly Naval Station Norfolk became Naval Station Mayport, Florida on 19 July 2021. She is currently a part of Carrier Strike Group 12.

Coat of arms

Shield 
The shield features an inescutcheon of his ancestral coat of arms and the cross of St. George. The traditional Navy colors were chosen for the shield because dark blue and gold represents the sea and excellence respectively. Red signifies sacrifice and valor. The cross of St. George and the fleur-de-lis are from Churchill's augmentation from his ancestor's coat of arms. The red cross on the white field is a reference to the flag of St. George. The gold lion over the field of red is a reference to the heritage of Great Britain. The lion shows strength, courage and determination. The nebuly is representative to the sky and clouds, which recall Britain enduring German airpower in the Battle of Britain. Winston Churchill's reputation of an inspiring war leader, talented statesman, orator and author is referred to by the stylized book.

Crest 
The crest consists of a trident encompassed by a chevron, laurel and oak. The trident is a symbol for sea prowess and represents the ship's vertical launch capabilities. The tridents tines denote air, surface, and anti-submarine warfare capabilities. A chevron divides the trident which suggests a "V" to signify victory in way and strength of defense in peace. The laurel symbolizes honor and achievement while the oak represents strength and resolve.

Motto 
The motto is written on a double scroll of red that has a white reverse side. The ship's motto, "In war: Resolution. In peace: Good Will", is taken from the epigraph of Churchill's The Second World War.

Seal 
The coat of arms in full color as in the blazon, upon a white background enclosed within a dark blue oval border edged on the outside with a gold rope and bearing the inscription "USS Winston S. Churchill" at the top and "DDG 81" in the base all gold.

Gallery

References

Further reading
 International Festival of the Sea Official Souvenir Programme ( 24–27 August 2001)
US Navy Press Release: USS Winston S. Churchill Intercepts Pirate Ship

External links

Youtube: Short video with internal and external footage of the DDG-81 shock trials

Ships built in Bath, Maine
Arleigh Burke-class destroyers
Destroyers of the United States
1999 ships
United States Navy ship names
Monuments and memorials to Winston Churchill